is a retired Japanese professional outfielder.

External links

Living people
1981 births
Baseball people from Saitama Prefecture
Japanese baseball players
Nippon Professional Baseball outfielders
Seibu Lions players
Saitama Seibu Lions players
Japanese baseball coaches
Nippon Professional Baseball coaches